Mabelle Massey Segrest, known as Mab Segrest (born February 20, 1949), is an American lesbian feminist and anti-racist writer, scholar and activist. Segrest is best known for her 1994 autobiographical work Memoir of a Race Traitor, which won the Editor's Choice Lambda Literary Award. Segrest is the former Fuller-Matthai Professor of Gender and Women's Studies at Connecticut College.

Career 
In the 1970s, Segrest moved to North Carolina to attend Duke University, where she earned her PhD in English literature in 1979. While studying at Duke, and for several years thereafter, she taught English at nearby Campbell University. Segrest worked at Connecticut College in New London, Connecticut since 2002 and in 2004 was appointed the Fuller-Matthai Professor of Gender and Women's Studies. She retired from teaching in 2014.

Social activism

Segrest has founded, served on the boards of, and consulted with a wide range of social justice organizations throughout her life and is a recognized speaker and writer on issues of sexism, racism, homophobia, classism, and other forms of oppression. From 1983 to 1990, Segrest worked with North Carolinians Against Racist and Religious Violence (NCARRV), for which she is credited by many for ridding North Carolina of the Ku Klux Klan. From 1992 to 2000 she served as coordinator of the Urban-Rural Mission (USA), part of the URM network of the World Council of Churches.

Writing

Until it disbanded in 1983, Segrest was a member of the Southern feminist writing collective Feminary, which also produced a journal of the same name. Feminarians, including Segrest, saw writing as a force for political change, and the journal maintained a Southern feminist focus and was anti-sexist, anti-racist, anti-homophobic, and anti-classist.

Through the collective and other activist work, Segrest generated material for her first book of essays, My Mama's Dead Squirrel.

Her book narrating her experience working against the Klan with North Carolinians Against Racist and Religious Violence (NCARRV) is Memoir of a Race Traitor, published in 1994. It was named an Outstanding Book on Human Rights in North America and was Editor's Choice for the Lambda Literary Awards. Memoir of a Race Traitor has been hailed by Howard Zinn as "extraordinary . . . It is a 'political memoir,' but its language is poetic and its tone passionate." It is considered a key text in white studies and anti-racist studies. In this work, Segrest outlines her definition of "queer socialism," which is how she defines her political stance. This version of socialism demands a more caring world where all citizens are taken into consideration when resources are allocated and opportunities are dispensed. She says that while there is no blueprint as yet for this form of socialism, it would be based in feminist theory and practice. It was re-released in 2019 by The New Press.

Segrest's book, Born to Belonging: Writings on Spirit and Justice was published in 2002 and recounts her experiences in activism around the world. Segrest co-edited Sing, Whisper, Shout, Pray: Feminist Strategies for a Just World (2003) with Jacqui Alexander, Lisa Albrect and Sharon Day.

Segres was awarded a fellowship at the National Humanities Center to support the writing of her Administrations of Lunacy: Racism and the Haunting of American Psychiatry at the Milledgeville Asylum on the history of the Central State Hospital in Milledgeville, Georgia, published in 2020 by The New Press.

In popular culture 
Founding Riot grrrl band Le Tigre mention Segrest's name in their 1999 single "Hot Topic," from their debut album Le Tigre. In listing important feminist figures, lead singer Kathleen Hanna described the song as "analogous to a college syllabus".

Segrest was depicted in the 2016 stage play The Integration of Tuskegee High School. The production premiered at Auburn University and dramatized Segrest's time as a student during the 1963-1964 school year in her hometown of Tuskegee, Alabama.

Publications 

 My Mama’s Dead Squirrel: Lesbian Essays on Southern Culture (Firebrand Books, 1985)
 Memoir of a Race Traitor (South End Press, 1994; re-released The New Press, 2019)
 Born to Belonging: Writings on Spirit and Justice (Rutgers University Press, 2002)
 Sing, Whisper, Shout, Pray: Feminist Strategies for a Just World (Edgework Books, 2003), co-edited with Jacqui Alexander, Lisa Albrect and Sharon Day 
 Administrations of Lunacy: Racism and the Haunting of American Psychiatry at the Milledgeville Asylum (The New Press, 2020)

References

Further reading
 Mab Segrest, “A Metahistory of Suffering: Race, Lunacy, and Psychiatry in Milledgeville, Georgia”, interview on the National Humanities Center podcast.
Mab Segrest interviewed on The Laura Flanders Show.
Julia Cristofano,"A Look Into the Life of Author, Activist, and Lesbian Feminist Mab Segrest," The College Voice, December 12, 2011.
Powell, Tamara. "Look What Happened Here: North Carolina's Feminary Collective." North Carolina Literary Review 9 (2000): 91–102.

External links
MabSegrest.com Segrest is an activist, writer, and teacher.  Her books include Memoir of a Race Traitor, Administrations of Lunacy, My Mama’s Dead Squirrel, Born to Belonging.
Mab Segrest, Fuller-Maathai Professor Emeritus of Gender and Women's Studies at Connecticut College
 "Guide to the Mab Segrest Papers," Duke University
"Mab Segrest with Barbara and Annie. Durham, NC," 1991, photograph in "Particular Voices: Portraits of Gay and Lesbian Writers" by Robert Giard at the New York Public Library.

1949 births
American feminists
American educators
Anti-classism
Living people
Duke University alumni
Lambda Literary Award winners
20th-century American writers
21st-century American writers
20th-century American women writers
21st-century American women writers
LGBT people from Alabama
American lesbian writers
Lesbian academics